Conjugated estrogens/medroxyprogesterone acetate (CEs/MPA), sold under the brand names Prempro and Premphase, is a combination product of conjugated equine estrogens (Premarin), an estrogen collected from horse urine, and medroxyprogesterone acetate (Provera), a progestogen, which is used in menopausal hormone therapy for the treatment of menopausal symptoms.

In 2018, it was the 308th most commonly prescribed medication in the United States, with more than 1million prescriptions.

See also
 Estradiol/medroxyprogesterone acetate
 Estradiol cypionate/medroxyprogesterone acetate
 List of combined sex-hormonal preparations

References

External links
 

Combined estrogen–progestogen formulations